NOHS may refer to:
 Negros Occidental High School, Bacolod City, Negros Occidental, Philippines
 North Oconee High School, Bogart, Georgia, United States
 North Oldham High School, Goshen, Kentucky, United States